Derek Adam Fleming (born 5 December 1973 in Falkirk) is a former Scottish football defender.

Fleming began his career in 1993 with stokeroo Meadowbank Thistle, where he made a total of 49 appearances before moving to Dunfermline Athletic in 1994. He has also played for Dundee, Livingston, Partick Thistle and Hamilton Academical. In the 2006–2007 season with Hamilton injury restricted him to only 19 first team appearances. He signed for Alloa Athletic under freedom of contract as manager Allan Maitland built a new squad for the 2007–08 season. He was released in May 2008.

Flea was an integral part of the Partick Thistle side that won the first division, playing both in midfield and at left back, he will be best remembered by jags fans as scoring the goal at Love Street that secured promotion to the Scottish Premier League. Flea also broke his leg in the process. Derek is now a player/coach for Linlithgow Rose.

External links

1973 births
Living people
Footballers from Falkirk
Scottish footballers
Dunfermline Athletic F.C. players
Dundee F.C. players
Livingston F.C. players
Partick Thistle F.C. players
Hamilton Academical F.C. players
Alloa Athletic F.C. players
Cowdenbeath F.C. players
Bo'ness United F.C. players
Linlithgow Rose F.C. players
Broxburn Athletic F.C. players
Scottish Football League players
Scottish Premier League players
Association football defenders